Paul Harris (born 21 February 1955) was an English cricketer. He was a right-handed batsman who played for Bedfordshire. He was born in Dagenham.

Harris debuted in the Minor Counties Championship in 1976, and made his sole List A appearance in the Gillette Cup competition of 1977, in a match which Bedfordshire lost by nine wickets.

Harris continued to represent Bedfordshire in the Minor Counties Championship until 1980.

References

1955 births
Living people
English cricketers
Bedfordshire cricketers
People from Dagenham